The London Warriors are an American football club based in Thornton Heath, London, England, they compete in the BAFA National Leagues Premier Division South, the highest level of British American football. They operate from Selhurst Sports Arena and were formed in 2007 as the London Cobras, but changed their name to Warriors a couple of years later. 

The Warriors are one of the most successful American football teams in the United Kingdom and since the BAFANL replaced the now redundant British American Football League, The Warriors have been the most dominant team under the League's new guise. They are five-time BritBowl champions, with their most recent victory coming against the Tamworth Phoenix in Britbowl XXXII and have won nine divisional titles in their thirteen-year history. The Warriors have had a number of different notable players including former NFL wide receiver Marvin Allen and Vernon Kay. In 2014 Warriors playing Efe Obada moved to the Dallas Cowboys and is now a Defensive End for the Washington Commanders.

History
The London Warriors were formed in 2007 as a senior team of the successful London Warriors youth team, who had won the British Youth American Football Association the previous two years running. After being accepted by the British American Football League as Affiliate Members, they arranged to play the two friendly matches required under BAFL regulations. In October 2007, the Warriors played home and away games against two teams from the British Universities American Football League—the first game was played at home to the Royal Holloway Vikings and ended in a 54–0 victory. One week later, they travelled to play the Loughborough Aces and won again, this time 42–7.

After completing their obligations, the BAFL formally accepted the Warriors (the Cobras) application to join the league in December 2007, allowing them to compete as full members for the 2008 season. They were placed into the newly renamed London and South East Conference in Division Two, where they made a huge impact, going on to complete an undefeated season, culminating in victory over the Tamworth Phoenix at Britbowl XXII.

Women's team
In 2015 Head Coach of the London Warriors Tony Allen invested his time to start a women's team. The London Warrior Women compete in both flag and tackle football. In 2015, they won the national flag football championship and in 2016 claimed the title of Southern Conference Champions.

Youth Team
In August 2012, the London Warriors Youth Kitted Team won the National Championship. The London Warriors also have a Flag Youth Team.

Junior Team
The London Warriors have conintued to grow their Junior Team under Head Coach Gerry Anderson.

Notable players
From 2008 to 2011 former Pittsburgh Steelers and Miami Dolphins wide receiver Marvin Allen played for The Warriors. In 2011 he was joined by TV presenter Vernon Kay who played as a cornerback until 2014. Defensive end, Efe Obada, was discovered at The Warriors, and after playing only four games during the 2014 season he moved to the NFL and was briefly signed by the Dallas Cowboys, Kansas City Chiefs, Atlanta Falcons, Carolina Panthers, and most recently Buffalo Bills.

Home field
The Warriors play their home games in South London.

Senior team season records

References

External links
London Warriors homepage

BAFA National League teams
American football teams in England
American football teams in London
2007 establishments in England
American football teams established in 2007